The Family Genius is a TV series aired in the United States from September 9 to September 30, 1949. The series was broadcast on the DuMont Television Network, and is most notable for lasting less than a month before cancellation.

Plot
The series was a sitcom centered around the Howard family, in which young son Tommy was a child prodigy.

Cast
 Jack Diamond as Tommy Howard
 Phyllis Lowe as Mrs. Howard
 Arthur Edwards as Mr. Howard

Episode status
As with most DuMont series, no episodes are known to exist.

Bibliography
David Weinstein, The Forgotten Network: DuMont and the Birth of American Television (Philadelphia: Temple University Press, 2004) 
Alex McNeil, Total Television, Fourth edition (New York: Penguin Books, 1980) 
Tim Brooks and Earle Marsh, The Complete Directory to Prime Time Network TV Shows, Third edition (New York: Ballantine Books, 1964)

See also
List of programs broadcast by the DuMont Television Network
List of surviving DuMont Television Network broadcasts

External links
The Family Genius at IMDB
DuMont historical website

DuMont Television Network original programming
1940s American sitcoms
1949 American television series debuts
Black-and-white American television shows
Lost television shows